Cytaea carolinensis is a species of jumping spiders.

Name
The species is named for the Caroline Islands, where it was collected.

Appearance
C. carolinensis is similar to C. ponapensis and C. rai. Males are 4–5 mm long, females 5.5–6.5 mm.

Distribution
C. carolinensis is known from Truk and the Palau group in the Caroline Islands.

References

  (2007): The world spider catalog, version 8.0. American Museum of Natural History.

External links
  (1998): Salticidae of the Pacific Islands. III.  Distribution of Seven Genera, with Description of Nineteen New Species and Two New Genera. Journal of Arachnology 26(2): 149-189. PDF

carolinensis
Spiders described in 1998
Arthropods of Indonesia
Spiders of Asia